Canada competed at the 1992 Winter Paralympics in Tignes-Albertville, France from March 25 to April 1, 1992. Canada entered 19 athletes in two of the three disciplines at the Games; fifteen in Alpine skiing, and four in Nordic skiing (cross-country skiing).

Medalists

See also
Canada at the 1992 Winter Olympics
Canada at the Paralympics

References

External links
Canadian Paralympic Committee official website
International Paralympic Committee official website

Nations at the 1992 Winter Paralympics
1992
Paralympics